Ophiolamia is a genus of parasitic sea snails, marine gastropod mollusks in the family Eulimidae.

Species
 Ophiolamia armigeri Warén & Carney, 1981
 Ophiolamia fragilissima Bouchet & Warén, 1986

References

 Warén A. & Carney R.S. 1981. Ophiolamia armigeri gen. et sp. n. (Mollusca, Prosobranchia) parasitic on the abyssal ophiuroid Ophiomusium armigerum. Sarsia, 66: 183-193

External links
 To World Register of Marine Species

Eulimidae